Nolan Lambroza (born July 25, 1990), better known as Sir Nolan, is an American record producer and songwriter based in Encino, Los Angeles, California. He has worked with notable artists such as Nick Jonas, Selena Gomez, Demi Lovato, Justin Bieber, Lil Wayne, Jason Derulo, Enrique Iglesias, Kelly Clarkson, Pitbull, Chris Brown, Poppy, Christina Aguilera, Magic, The Wanted, Rita Ora, Dan + Shay, Lady Antebellum, The Band Perry and many more.

Partial discography
Selena Gomez – Rare (Interscope)
"Rare" Producer, Writer
"Ring" Producer, Writer
"Crowded Room" featuring 6lack Producer, Writer
Selena Gomez – Revival (Interscope)
"Good for You" featuring ASAP Rocky   Producer, writer, musician
Tate McRae
"Slower"  Producer, writer
Bryce Vine - (Sire/WB)
"Drew Barrymore" Producer, writer, musician 
"La La Land" featuring YG Producer, writer, musician
"Baby Girl" Producer, writer, musician
Alec Benjamin
"Let Me Down Slowly"  Producer, writer, musician
"Oh My God" Producer, writer, musician
"The Way You Felt" Producer, writer
Chelsea Cutler
"Devil On My Shoulder" Producer, writer
Kehlani
"Nights Like This"  Producer, writer, musician
DJ Khaled featuring Justin Bieber, Chance the Rapper and Quavo
"No Brainer" Producer, writer, musician
Shawn Mendes – Shawn Mendes (Island)
"Youth" featuring Khalid Writer
Nick Jonas – Nick Jonas (Island)
"Jealous"   Producer, writer, musician
"Area Code"   Writer
Nick Jonas – Last Year Was Complicated (Island)
"Chainsaw (Nick Jonas song)"   Producer, writer, musician
"Bacon (featuring Ty Dolla $ign)"   Producer, writer, musician
"Unhinged"   Producer, writer, musician
"Don't Make Me Choose"   Producer, writer, musician
LANY - Malibu Nights
"Thick and Thin" Writer
Dermot Kennedy - Without Fear
"Redemption" Producer, Writer
Carly Rae Jepsen
"Cut To The Feeling" Producer, Writer
COIN
"Nobodys Baby" Writer
Pitbull – Global Warming (Mr. 305 / RCA)
"Feel This Moment" (feat. Christina Aguilera)   Producer, writer, musician
"Hope We Meet Again" (feat. Chris Brown)   Producer, writer, musician

Fifth Harmony – 7/27 (Epic)
"All in My Head (Flex)"   Writer
"Squeeze"   Co-Producer, writer, musician
Demi Lovato (Island)
"Body Say"   Producer, writer, musician
"Ready for Ya"   Producer, writer, musician
5 Seconds Of Summer –
"If Walls Could Talk"  Producer, writer, musician
Daya –
"New"  Producer, writer, musician
Rita Ora – Phoenix
"Anywhere"  Producer, writer, musician
Tinashe  Joyride
"Flame"   Producer, writer 
Billy Raffoul
"Driver"   Producer, writer
LANY -  LANY
"Good Girls"   Producer
Louis Tomlinson & Steve Aoki - Neon Future III
"Just Hold On"  Producer, Co-writer
Justin Bieber – Believe (Island / Def Jam)
"All Around the World (feat. Ludacris)   Producer, writer, musician
"Believe"   Producer, writer, musician
"Make You Believe"   Producer, writer, musician
Justin Bieber – Journals (Island / Def Jam)
"Backpack (feat. Lil Wayne)   Producer, musician
Rita Ora
"Poison (Rita Ora song)"   Producer, writer, musician
Kelly Clarkson – Piece by Piece (RCA)
"War Paint"   Writer
Rachel Platten – Wildfire (Columbia)
"Speechless"   Producer, writer, musician
Dan + Shay – Obsessed (Warner Brothers)
"Obsessed"   Writer
That Poppy – Bubblebath (EP) (Island)
"Lowlife"   Producer, writer, musician
The Wanted – Word of Mouth (Island / Def Jam)
"We Own the Night"   Producer, writer, musician
Lea Michele – Louder (Columbia)
"Burn With You"   Producer, writer, musician
Karmin – 
"Try Me On"   Producer, writer, musician
Justice Crew – 
"Que Sera"   Producer, writer, musician - Longest running hit in ARIA history.

Sir Nolan is published by Warner Chappell for the world, and managed by Lucas Keller at Milk & Honey.

References

1990 births
Living people
People from Encino, Los Angeles
American music video directors
Record producers from California
Record producers from Washington, D.C.
American pop musicians